Michael Berrin (born May 6, 1967), best known by his stage name MC Serch, is an American rapper and music executive. He gained fame as a member of the group 3rd Bass, which was active in the late 1980s and early 1990s. Serch has also worked as a solo artist and as a producer for other artists. In 1994, Serch executive produced Nas' debut album, Illmatic, which is "widely seen as the best hip-hop album ever" according to Billboard magazine.

Early life and education 
Serch grew up in Far Rockaway, Queens, New York City. He attended Far Rockaway High School and graduated from Music & Art High School. He is of Jewish descent.

Career 

After recording three albums with 3rd Bass — The Cactus Album (1989), The Cactus Revisited (1990), and Derelicts of Dialect (1991)—Serch launched a solo career with Return of the Product (1992, Def Jam). The album featured two hit singles: "Here It Comes" (which hit #1 on Billboard's Hot Rap Tracks chart); and "Back to the Grill" featuring Chubb Rock, Red Hot Lover Tone, and Nas. Serch was the executive producer of Nas’ Illmatic. 

He also helped to cultivate the rapper O.C. after hearing him on the Organized Konfusion song "Fudge Pudge", helping him secure a record contract with Wild Pitch Records. In 1995, Serch also mentored the newly formed Non Phixion.

Since retiring from performing, Serch has run a promotions company (Serchlite Music). He appeared in Spike Lee's Bamboozled (2000) as a member of the fictitious hip-hop group Mau Maus (played by other real-life hip-hop performers such as Mos Def, Charli Baltimore and Canibus). His character was a white revolutionary who was supposed to be "1/16 black". 

From 2003, he hosted Serch In The AM on Detroit urban radio station FM 98 WJLB; he was the first Jewish DJ at that station. MC Serch was dismissed from WJLB in March 2006, reportedly due to a dispute over a Super Bowl weekend party at the club Motor City Live. 

Serch also hosted the VH1 reality series Ego Trip's The (White) Rapper Show which ended in March 2007. On the show he was known for his catchphrase "Woop-WOOP!". A follow-up show, Ego Trip's Miss Rap Supreme, debuted in 2008.

Serch has since returned to the radio airwaves in Detroit on the urban station Hot 102.7. Serch has also worked with Hot 102.7's youngest intern (The Black Intern) Daniel Berry, and Rucka Rucka Ali (Comedy Music Artist). Serch appeared in some of Rucka Rucka Ali's music videos.

In 2018 he gave an interview with DJ Vlad in which he claimed MC Hammer had once taken out a $50,000 contract on Serch's life, following a misunderstanding over lyrics.

In May 2021, MC Serch joined VidSig, a live global video platform, as Chief Creative Consultant.

Serch was an executive at HitPiece, a startup creating NFTs of songs that shut down in February 2022 under threat of action by Recording Industry Association of America, which labeled it a "scam operation" and after public criticism by major artists including Wolfgang Van Halen.

Discography

Solo 
Return of the Product (1992, Def Jam)

with 3rd Bass 
The Cactus Album (1989, Platinum)
The Cactus Revisited (1990)
Derelicts of Dialect (1991, Gold)

Guest appearances

References

External links 
The Serch Says Podcast
MC Serch Interview

1967 births
Living people
American hip hop record producers
20th-century American Jews
American male rappers
Def Jam Recordings artists
Far Rockaway High School alumni
Fiorello H. LaGuardia High School alumni
Jewish rappers
People from Far Rockaway, Queens
Rappers from New York City
Jewish hip hop record producers
21st-century American rappers
Record producers from New York (state)
21st-century American male musicians
20th-century American rappers
20th-century American male musicians
21st-century American Jews